MLC may refer to:

Companies and organizations
 MLC Limited, an Australian financial services company
 Major League Cricket, American Twenty20 professional cricket league
 Marine Logistics Command
 Maritime Labour Convention
 Mauritius Labour Congress
 Meat and Livestock Commission
 Mechanical Licensing Collective
 Midwest Lacrosse Conference
 Monarchist League of Canada
 Mono Lake Committee, an environmental organization in Lee Vining, California
 Motors Liquidation Company, the former General Motors
 Movement for the Liberation of the Congo, a political party
 Myanmar Language Commission

Schools
 MLC School, New South Wales, Australia
 Martin Luther College in New Ulm, Minnesota
 Methodist Ladies' College (disambiguation)
 Metropolitan Learning Center (Bloomfield, Connecticut), a 6-12 school
 Metropolitan Learning Center (Portland, Oregon), a K-12 school
 Midland Lutheran College
 Minnesota Life College

Science
 Megalencephalic leukoencephalopathy with subcortical cysts
 Mixed leukocyte culture, an immunological assay
 Multileaf collimator, a tool used for shaping radiation beams in external-beam radiotherapy
 Myosin light chain, a subunit of myosin
 Machine Learning Classifier, a type of artificial intelligence

Other
 Legislative Council of the Isle of Man
 25 Martin Place, building Sydney, Australia formerly named the MLC Centre
 MLC conjecture, on the local connectivity of the Mandelbrot set
 Maharashtra Legislative Council
 Member of the Legislative Council
 Member of the Legislative Council (India)
 Mercados Libres Campesinos
 Military Load Classification, e.g. MLC 75, MLC 85
 Motor landing craft, a British WWII landing craft
 Multi-level cell, a type of flash memory
 MLC Building (disambiguation)